Melchie Daëlle Dumornay (born 17 August 2003), also known as Corventina, is a Haitian professional footballer who plays as a midfielder for Division 1 Féminine club Reims and the Haiti national team. She will join Lyon on 1 July 2023.

Considered as one of the most promising talents of her generation in women's football, in 2022 Dumornay won Goal's NXGN award as the best teenage player in the world.

Club career

Early career 
Born in Mirebalais, Dumornay is a product of ' youth system. In 2018, she was noticed by Reims' manager, Amandine Miquel, while performing at the FIFA U-20 Women's World Cup in France, as the club eventually kept scouting her. Around the same period of time, she was offered a trial by fellow French club Lyon. However, neither of the two clubs were able to sign the player, both because of her underage status at the time and the effects of the Haitian crisis.

Reims 
After attracting the interest of several high-profile clubs all around the world, on 9 September 2021 Dumornay officially joined Reims on a permanent deal, signing her first professional contract with the French club. In the process, she re-united with fellow Haitian footballer Kethna Louis.

On 2 October of the same year, she made her professional debut for Reims, coming on as a substitute at half-time of a Division 1 Féminine match against Issy: in the same occasion, she provided two assists for Kessya Bussy, thus helping her side gain a 3–1 win. One week later, on 9 October, she made her first start against Bordeaux, scoring a brace and serving an assist in a 5–2 victory.

In the following season, Dumornay was awarded as Division 1 Féminine Player of the Month in December 2022.

On 16 January 2023, it was officially announced that Dumornay would join Division 1 Féminine title holders Lyon on a permanent deal starting from 1 July 2023, as she signed a contract until June 2026 with the club.

International career

Youth national teams 
Dumornay represented Haiti at various youth international levels.

After taking part in the 2016 CONCACAF Girls' U-15 Championship, she took part in three different tournaments throughout 2018. Firstly, she played in the 2018 CONCACAF Women's U-20 Championship, where Haiti finished third and became the first-ever Caribbean national team to qualify for a FIFA U-20 Women's World Cup. Secondly, she was called-up for the 2018 CONCACAF Women's U-17 Championship, where she helped the Haitian team reach a fourth-place finish and was awarded wit the Golden Ball. Finally, in August of the same year, she was included in the Haitian squad that took part in the 2018 FIFA U-20 Women's World Cup.

In 2020, she was involved once again in the CONCACAF Women's U-20 Championship, where she eventually received the Golden Boot, having scored 14 goals throughout the competition.

Haiti senior national team 
On 29 January 2020, Dumornay made her debut with the Haitian senior national team, starting and playing full 90 minutes in a 4–0 Olympic qualifier loss against the United States.

In July 2022, she was included in the Haitian squad that took part in the CONCACAF W Championship in Mexico: she was eventually named both as the Best Young Player and in the tournament's Best XI, having helped Haiti qualify for the inter-confederation play-offs for the 2023 FIFA Women's World Cup.

On 21 February 2023, Dumornay scored a brace in the inter-confederation play-off final against Chile, thus helping her nation gain a 2–1 win and qualify for its first ever FIFA Women's World Cup.

Career statistics

Club

International goals

Personal life 
Dumornay is also known as "Corventina", a nickname that was first given to her by her older brother.

In November 2022, she signed a long-term sponsorship deal with Adidas.

Honours 
Individual
 CONCACAF Women's U-17 Championship Golden Ball: 2018
 CONCACAF Women's U-17 Championship Best XI: 2018
CONCACAF Women's U-20 Championship Golden Boot: 2020
 CONCACAF W Championship Best Young Player: 2022
 CONCACAF W Championship Best XI: 2022

References

External links 

 
 

2003 births
Living people
Women's association football midfielders
Haitian women's footballers
People from Centre (department)
Haiti women's international footballers
Stade de Reims Féminines players
Division 1 Féminine players
Haitian expatriate footballers
Expatriate women's footballers in France
Haitian expatriate sportspeople in France